Köpetdag Stadium is a multi-purpose stadium in Ashgabat, Turkmenistan.  It is currently used mostly for football matches and serves as the home for Köpetdag Aşgabat.  The stadium holds 26,503 people and was built in 1997.

History 
The stadium was built in 1997 by international technical company Mensel JV. Since opening, it has served as the home arena of Köpetdag Aşgabat.

In 2015 the stadium underwent radical reconstruction and reopened for the cup match played between Köpetdag and FC Merw.

References

Football venues in Turkmenistan
Multi-purpose stadiums in Turkmenistan
Sports venues in Ashgabat
Sports venues completed in 1997
1997 establishments in Turkmenistan